This is the results breakdown of the local elections held in Cantabria on 25 May 2003. The following tables show detailed results in the autonomous community's most populous municipalities, sorted alphabetically.

City control
The following table lists party control in the most populous municipalities, including provincial capitals (shown in bold). Gains for a party are displayed with the cell's background shaded in that party's colour.

Municipalities

Santander
Population: 184,661

Torrelavega
Population: 56,180

See also
2003 Cantabrian regional election

References

Cantabria
2003